HMS Dublin, together with  and , was a  light cruiser of the Chatham subgroup, each costing an average £334,053.

Design and description
Dublin displaced  at normal load. The engines were powered by 12 Yarrow boilers. The ship's complement was 475 officers and ratings.

Her main armament consisted of eight BL  Mk XI guns in single pivot mounts, protected by gun shields. Four Vickers quick-firing (QF) three-pounder guns were fitted in the superstructure. The ship also mounted two submerged  torpedo tubes. A QF three-inch 20 cwt anti-aircraft gun was added in 1915 on the centreline on a mount between the funnels and the mainmast.

Operational history
Dublin was laid down on 11 April 1911 by Wm. Beardmore & Company in Dalmuir (near Glasgow) Scotland. Dublin was launched on 30 April 1912 and completed in March 1913. She was initially assigned to the 1st Battle Squadron in 1913 and then to the 1st Light Cruiser Squadron in July 1913, operating in the Mediterranean.  She was then reassigned to the 2nd Light Cruiser Squadron from September 1913 to the end of 1914.

Pursuit of Goeben
Captain John Kelly pursued the German cruiser  to Messina (off the north coast of Sicily) on 4 August 1914 just prior to the outbreak of the First World War. On 6 August after having completed coaling, Dublin left Malta at 14:00 to join Rear-Admiral Ernest Troubridge's squadron. At 20:30 she received orders to obtain Goebens course and sink her during the night, by torpedoes if possible. Observing at a distance, Kelly expected to engage around 03:30 but Goeben had unexpectedly altered course to the north.

Gallipoli and torpedoing
In February 1915, Dublin was sent to the Dardanelles and subsequently assisted 's landing assault upon Gallipoli, on 25 April 1915 at X Beach. She was then sent to Brindisi in May 1915. While taking part in a sweep off the Albanian coast, and whilst escorted by French and Italian destroyers, Dublin was hit and damaged by a torpedo from the Austro-Hungarian Navy submarine U-4 on 9 June 1915.

In home waters
Now under Captain Albert Charles Scott (later Vice Admiral; HMS Dublin 1916-1918), she participated in the Battle of Jutland on 31 May 1916. During the subsequent night actions, Dublin fired 117 6-inch shells and, along with Southampton, attacked and sank a destroyer. Both ships, however, sustained severe damage. Subsequent repairs to Dublin were not completed until 17 June.

On 3 May 1917 in the North Sea, Dublin with the Australian cruiser  and four destroyers (Nepean, Obdurate, Pelican, Pylades), left Rosyth for a sweep between the mouths of the Forth and the Humber. The following day, during an action in the North Sea, Dublin observed the Zeppelin L 43 about 17 miles away to the east at 10:25, rapidly approaching a strange vessel. Both cruisers promptly made for the enemy, opening fire on it at extreme range. At 10:54 Dublin saw the track of a torpedo passing ahead of her. At 11:12 a submarine was sighted and at 11:15 another one was spotted, which fired two torpedoes at her. At 11:20 she sighted a third submarine, which she engaged with her guns and on which she dropped a depth-charge.  The Zeppelin made a direct attack: making for the stern of Dublin and rising hastily as it flew, it endeavoured to obtain a position vertically above the cruiser in order to drop bombs on her - an attempt which was foiled by Dublins hurried swerve to starboard.

Post-war career
Dublin was commissioned for the 6th squadron at the Africa Station from January 1920 until 1924, though she served for a short time in April with the 3rd squadron in the Mediterranean until being sent to the Reserve at Nore in 1924. She was sold for scrapping to J.J. King at Troon in July 1926, but she ran aground on the way to the breakers. She was refloated in July 1927 and broken up later that year.

Notes

Footnotes

References

External links
Chatham Second Class Protected Cruisers at World War 1.co.uk
Battle of Jutland Crew Lists Project - HMS Dublin Crew List

 

Town-class cruisers (1910) of the Royal Navy
Ships built on the River Clyde
1912 ships
World War I cruisers of the United Kingdom
Maritime incidents in 1915